Lutispora is an anaerobic, spore-forming, rod-shaped and moderately thermophilic bacterial genus from the family of Clostridiaceae with one known species (Lutispora thermophila).

References

Clostridiaceae
Bacteria genera
Monotypic bacteria genera
Taxa described in 2008